West Nordic Council's Children and Youth Literature Prize is a literary award, which was established in 2002 by the West Nordic Council. The prize is awarded every second year at the annual meeting of the West Nordic Council, normally in August. The three countries of the North West region of Northern Europe are Greenland, Iceland and the Faroe Islands (Greenland and Faroe Islands are autonomous constituent countries of the Kingdom of Denmark). These countries nominate one literary work each. The winner gets a reward of DKK 60 000 and his or her book is translated into the other two languages of the region and into one of the Scandinavian languages: Norwegian, Danish, Swedish or Finnish, without any expenses for the winner.

The winners 
 2020 - Langelstur að eilífu by Bergrún Íris Sævarsdóttir
 2018 - Træið by Bárður Oskarsson
 2016 - Hon, sum róði eftir ælaboganum, by Rakel Helmsdal
 2014 - Tidsskisten by Andri Snær Magnason
 2012 - Kaassalimik oqaluttuaq (The Story of Kaassali), by Lars-Pele Berthelsen
 2010 - Garðurinn (Kirkegården), by Gerður Kristný
 2008 - Draugaslóð (Ghost Track / Danish title: Spøgelsesspor), by Kristín Helga Gunnarsdóttir
 2006 - Ein hundur, ein ketta og ein mús (A Dog, A Cat and a Mouse / Danish title: En hund, en kat og en mus), by Bárður Oskarsson
 2004 - Engill í vesturbænum (An Angel in the Neighbourhood / En engel i nabolaget), af Kristín Steinsdóttir by Halla Sólveig Þorgeirsdóttir
 2002 - Sagan af bláa hnettinum (Historien om den blå planet), by Andri Snær Magnason

The Nominees

2020

From Iceland 
 Langelstur að eilífu by Bergrún Íris Sævarsdóttir

From Greenland 
 Orpilissat nunarsuarmi kusanarnersaat by Juaaka Lyberth

From the Faroe Islands 
 Loftar tú mær? by Rakel Helmsdal

2018

From Iceland 
 Úlfur og Edda by Kristín Ragna Gunnarsdóttir

From Greenland 
 Kammagiitta! Vil du være min ven? by Maja-Lisa Kehlet

From the Faroe Islands 
 Træið by Bárður Oskarsson

2016

From Iceland 
 Mamma Klikk, by Gunnar Helgason

From Greenland 
 AVUU, by Frederik “Kunngi” Kristensen

From the Faroe Islands 
 Hon, sum róði eftir ælaboganum, by Rakel Helmsdal

2014

From Iceland 
 Tímakistan, by Andri Snær Magnason

From Greenland 
 Den magiske kasket, by Kathrine Rosing

From the Faroe Islands 
 Flata Kaninin, by Bárður Oskarsson

2012

From Iceland 
 Með heiminn í vasanum (With the World in the Pocket / Danish title: Med hele verden i lommen), by Margrét Örnólfsdóttir

From Greenland 
 Kaassalimik oqaluttuaq (The Story of Kaassali / Danish title: Fortælling om Kaassali), by Lars-Pele Berthelsen

From the Faroe Islands 
 Skriva í sandin (Write in the Sand / Danish title: Skriv i sandet), by Marjun Syderbø Kjelnæs

2010

From Iceland 
Garðurinn (The Grave Yard / Danish title: Kirkegården), by Gerður Kristný

From Greenland 
 Sila, by Lana Hansen

From the Faroe Islands 
Várferðin til brúnna, by Rakel Helmsdal

2008

From Iceland 
 Draugaslóð (Danish title: Spøgelsesspor), by Kristín Helga Gunnarsdóttir

From Greenland 
 Abct, by Julie Edel Hardenber

From the Faroe Islands 
 Apollonia, by Edward Fuglø

2006

From Iceland 
 Frosnu tærnar (Frozen Toes / De frosne tæer), by Sigrún Eldjárn

From Greenland 
 Nissimaat nissimaajaqqallu (Santa Claus / Danish title: Nissemænd og små nisser), by Grethe Guldager illustrated by Nuka Godfredsen

From the Faroe Islands 
 Ein hundur, ein ketta og ein mús (A dog, a cat and a Mouse / Danish title: En hund, en kat og en mus), by Bárður Oskarsson

2004

From Greenland 
 Inuk sodavandillu akuukkat (Inuk - The poisoned soft drink / Danish title: Inuk - og forgiftede sodavand), by Jokum Nielsen

From Iceland 
 Engill í vesturbænum, by Kristín Steinsdóttir illustrated by Halla Sólveig Þorgeirsdóttir

From the Faroe Islands 
 Loppugras (poems) by Sólrun Michelsen illustrated by Hanni Bjartalíð. Includes a musical-CD, with songs sung by a school class, songs from the book.

2002

From Greenland 
 Sialuarannguaq, by Jørgen Petersen

From Iceland 
 Sagan af bláa hnettinum, by Andri Snær Magnason

From the Faroe Islands 
 Kuffa by Brynhild Andreasen (text) and Astrid MacDonald (drawings)

References

External links 
 Vestnordisk.is (About the prize)

Nordic literary awards
Faroese literary awards
Greenlandic literary awards
Icelandic literary awards
Children's literary awards